Arnaldo A. Ferraro (born September 3, 1936), is an American politician from New York.

Biography
He was born on September 3, 1936, in Italy. He emigrated to the United States in 1961 and later founded the Fiorello LaGuardia Republican Organization and the National Federation of Italian-American Societies. He graduated B.S. from Fordham University, and is also a Ph.D.

He was a member of the New York State Assembly (49th D.) in 1985 and 1986. In November 1986, he ran for re-election but was defeated by Democrat Peter J. Abbate Jr.

More recently, Ferraro ran for Chairman of the Kings County Republican Committee in 2009. He resides in the Dyker Heights section of Brooklyn with his wife Jean.

References

External links

Bio on the LaGuardia Club Website

1936 births
American people of Italian descent
Living people
Italian emigrants to the United States
Republican Party members of the New York State Assembly
Politicians from Brooklyn
Place of birth missing (living people)
Fordham University alumni
People from Dyker Heights, Brooklyn
20th-century American politicians